Mokena is a village in Will County, Illinois, United States. The population was 19,887 at the 2020 census. The Census Bureau's 2019 estimate found that the population had increased to 20,159.

Etymology

Mokena is a name apparently derived from a Native American language meaning "turtle". While the particular language from which the name originates is not documented, likely candidates are Anishinaabemowin, whose word for "snapping turtle" is mikinaak, and its close sister language Potawatomi, in which the same animal is called mkenak. Both languages were once spoken in the area now occupied by the town.

It is bordered by Tinley Park to the northeast, Orland Park to the north, Homer Glen to the northwest, Frankfort to the south and New Lenox to the west.

Education 

Elementary school services are provided by one of four school districts: Mokena School District 159, New Lenox School District 122, Frankfort School District 157C, and Summit Hill School District 161. Schools within District 159 include MES (Mokena Elementary School), MIS (Mokena Intermediate School), and MJHS (Mokena Junior High School). Mokena is served by Lincoln-Way Community High School District 210; students living in districts 159 or 122 attend Lincoln-Way Central High School, and students living in districts 157C or 161 attend Lincoln-Way East High School. Higher education is provided at Joliet Junior College, the nation's first public community college, and at Rasmussen College.

Demographics

As of the census of 2010, there were 18,740 people, 6,358 households, and 5,120 families residing in the village. The racial makeup of the village was 94.5% White, 1.3% African American, 0.01% Native American, 2.0% Asian, 0.01% Pacific Islander, 0.9% from other races, and 0.63% from two or more races. Hispanic or Latino of any race were 4.8% of the population.

As of the census of 2000, there were 4,703 households, out of which 48.5% had children under the age of 18 living with them, 73.7% were married couples living together, 7.3% had a female householder with no husband present, and 16.8% were non-families. 14.0% of all households were made up of individuals, and 3.3% had someone living alone who was 65 years of age or older. The average household size was 3.10 and the average family size was 3.46.

In the village, the population was spread out, with 32.4% under the age of 18, 7.1% from 18 to 24, 32.7% from 25 to 44, 21.5% from 45 to 64, and 6.2% who were 65 years of age or older. The median age was 34 years. For every 100 females, there were 101.5 males. For every 100 females age 18 and over, there were 97.3 males.

The median family income is $82,596 and the median income for a household is $91,817. Males had a median income of $58,226 versus $31,522 for females. The per capita income for the village was $31,944.  As of 2008, the median house value was $350,130, up from $211,300 in 2000.

About 0.7% of families and 1.0% of the population were below the poverty line, including 0.6% of those under age 18 and 4.6% of those age 65 or over.

Transportation 

The Village of Mokena is serviced by the Metra rail service Rock Island District. Mokena has two commuter rail stations, Hickory Creek and Front Street, providing service to downtown Chicago's LaSalle Street Station, connecting with components of the Chicago Transit Authority. Mokena is also served by I-80, which runs along its northern border. Through I-80 commuters have convenient access to I-355 (Veteran's Memorial Tollway) and I-57. The main north–south thoroughfares are US Route 45 (LaGrange Rd) and Wolf Rd. The main east–west thoroughfares are 191st St, LaPorte Rd., and US Route 30 (Lincoln Highway). Rail freight traffic travels along both the Metra RI District Railway (Metra RI) and the Canadian National Railway (CN). The CN tracks run east/west along Mokena's southern boundary, while the Metra Rock Island District (Metra) tracks approximately bisect the town in a northeastern/southwestern direction.

Notable people 

 Dean Anna, MLB player; born in Mokena
 James Augustine, former University of Illinois and NBA player
 Terry Boers, sports radio host and Chicago Sun-Times columnist 
 Exene Cervenka, singer and writer; grew up in Mokena
 Karla DeVito, actress, voice actress, and singer; born in Mokena
 Christian Dvorak, NHL player
 Clay Guida, mixed martial artist, Jason's brother
 Jason Guida, mixed martial artist, Clay's brother
 Don C. Hall, state actor and Wisconsin state legislator; lived in Mokena
 Ron Kittle, former MLB player, lives in Mokena
 Denise Richards, model and actress, lived in Mokena

References

External links
Mokena official website
Mokena School District 159
Frankfort School District 157C
Summit Hill School District 161
Wikimapia Contributions

Villages in Illinois
Villages in Will County, Illinois
Populated places established in 1880
1880 establishments in Illinois